On October 11, 2002, King Gyanendra of Nepal, appointed an interim cabinet with Lokendra Bahadur Chand as its Prime Minister.

Ministers

References

2002 in Nepal
Cabinet of Nepal
Government of Nepal
2002 establishments in Nepal
2003 disestablishments in Nepal